Virus Research is a peer-reviewed scientific journal which focuses on fundamental research in all aspects of virology. The journal was established in 1984 by Brian Mahy and Richard Compans.

Abstracting and indexing
The journal is abstracted and indexed in:

According to the Journal Citation Reports, the journal has a 2018 impact factor of 2.736. In 2021, the impact factor was updated to 6.286.

References

Virology journals
Hybrid open access journals